The Transportation and Ticket Center (TTC) is an intermodal monorail, ferry, and bus transportation hub on the Walt Disney World Resort. The station serves both the Magic Kingdom and Epcot spurs of the Walt Disney World Monorail System, as well as conventional bus and taxis in the Greater Orlando Region.

Transport to Magic Kingdom

Magic Kingdom lies more than a mile away from its parking lot, on the opposite side of the man-made Seven Seas Lagoon. Upon arrival, guests are taken by the parking lot trams to the TTC, which sells tickets to the parks and provides transportation connections throughout the resort complex. It also has a small gift shop.

To reach the park, guests use the Walt Disney World Monorail System, the Staten Island Ferry-style ferryboats, Disney Transport buses, or ridesharing company vehicles, depending on the location of their hotel or parking lot. All guests who are not staying at the resort's hotels must transfer from the parking lot trams to the monorail or the ferry system upon arrival at the TTC, while guests who park in the disability parking area can walk directly to the TTC from their car. However, guests who are staying at any of the resort's hotels have several options:
 Guests staying at the three hotels closest to Magic Kingdom (Disney's Contemporary Resort, Disney's Polynesian Village Resort, and Disney's Grand Floridian Resort & Spa) can use either the ferry or the monorail system to travel to the Magic Kingdom. In addition, there are walking paths from the Contemporary and Grand Floridian resorts to the Magic Kingdom.
 Guests staying at Disney's Wilderness Lodge and Disney's Fort Wilderness Campground can ride a dedicated ferry boat to the Magic Kingdom docks.
 Guests staying at Shades of Green may take a walking path to the Polynesian Village Resort and use the aforementioned options, or take a bus to the TTC and transfer there.
 Guests staying at the other hotels may take buses or rideshare vehicles to travel to the park; however, guests taking rideshare vehicles must transfer at the TTC or walk to the park from the Contemporary Resort, as rideshare vehicles cannot use the park's bus loops.

The main monorail loop has two lanes. The outer lane is a direct nonstop loop between the TTC and Magic Kingdom (called the Express Line), while the inner loop has additional stops at Disney's Contemporary Resort, Disney's Polynesian Resort, and Disney's Grand Floridian Resort & Spa (called the Resort Line). Epcot is accessible by a spur monorail line that was added upon that park's opening in 1982.

The parking lot at the TTC is organized as follows:

Former bus service
Prior to December 2013, buses to and from Disney's Animal Kingdom and Disney's Hollywood Studios operated out of TTC instead of the Magic Kingdom bus stop. With the addition of a third bus loop at the Magic Kingdom, these buses moved to the Magic Kingdom and left the TTC without any regular Disney Transport bus routes.

In addition, prior to the Magic Kingdom's bus stop being built in the late 1980s/early 1990s, buses also traveled to several other Walt Disney World resorts, including Fort Wilderness, Disney Institute, Swan and Dolphin, and Caribbean Beach, among others. Buses also served Downtown Disney, Fort Wilderness, and Wilderness Lodge in the past as well.

See also
Rail transport in Walt Disney Parks and Resorts

References

Bus stations in Florida
Transportation buildings and structures in Orange County, Florida
Walt Disney World transit